Look Out, Officer! (師兄撞鬼) is a 1990 Hong Kong comedy film directed by Lau Sez-yue and starring Stephen Chow, Bill Tung and Stanley Fung. The film is a remake of the 1986 film, Where's Officer Tuba?, which starred Sammo Hung.

Cast and roles
 Stephen Chow as Sing
 Bill Tung as Uncle Cheung Biu
 Stanley Fung as Li Kam
 Vivian Chen as Yuk
 Sunny Fang as Tang Lee-yang
 Amy Yip as Kam's Superior (cameo)
 Cutie Mui as Police officer counting bullets
 Mak Yan-wa as Undercover policewoman
 Bak Ka-sin as Undercover policewoman
 Chan Lap-ban as Cleaning lady
 Lee Hang as Biu
 Tang Tai-wo as Tang's assistant
 Chun Kwai-bo as Tang's drug worker
 Tony Tam as Tang's drug worker
 Mak Wai-cheung as Tang's drug worker
 Ho Wing-cheung as Tang's drug worker
 Law Ching-ho as Heavenly judge
 Wong Tin-lam as Movie director (cameo)
 Ling Chi-hung as Tang's thug
 Tam Wai-man as Tang's thug
 Indra Leech as Police officer
 Simon Cheung as Policeman
 Fei Pak as Policeman
 Ernest Mauser as Ceausescu
 Woo Wing-tat as Tang's drug worker
 Tam Ho-sing
 Sam Ka-kei
 Danny Tang as Massage parlour thug

External links
 
 Look out, Officer! at HKCinemagic

1990 films
1990 comedy films
Hong Kong slapstick comedy films
Hong Kong ghost films
Supernatural comedy films
Police detective films
1990s Cantonese-language films
Shaw Brothers Studio films
Remakes of Hong Kong films
Hong Kong films about revenge
Films set in Hong Kong
Films shot in Hong Kong
1990s ghost films
1990s Hong Kong films